Sodium tetrachloroaluminate, also known as natrium chloroaluminate, is a chemical compound with the formula . It was discovered in the 20th century. It is the sodium salt of the tetrachloroaluminate anion.

Sodium tetrachloroaluminate can be prepared from sodium chloride and aluminium trichloride.

Uses 
Molten sodium tetrachloroaluminate is used as an electrolyte in sodium-nickel chloride batteries.

See also 

Sodium aluminate
Sodium hexafluoroaluminate
Sodium tetrafluoroborate

External links 
Studies of the electrochemistry of niobium(V) in sodium chloroaluminate and fluorochloroaluminate melts

Tetrachloroaluminates
Sodium compounds